The Buddhist view of marriage considers marriage a secular affair and as such, it is not considered a sacrament. Buddhists are expected to follow the civil laws regarding marriage laid out by their respective governments.

While the ceremony itself is civil, many Buddhists obtain the blessing from monks at the local temple after the marriage is completed.

History

Gautama Buddha never spoke against marriage but instead pointed out some of the difficulties of marriage. He is quoted in the Parabhava Sutta as saying

Views

The Pali Canon, a major Theravada text, bars both male and female monastics from both heterosexual and homosexual activities. While homosexuality may or may not be explicitly condemned in some texts, according to the Dalai Lama:

While Buddhism may neither encourage nor discourage getting married, it does provide principles regarding it.

The Digha Nikaya 31 (Sigalovada Sutta) describes the respect that one is expected to give to one's spouse.

In Tibetan Buddhism
The Dalai Lama has spoken of the merits of marriage:

Divorce
Since marriage is secular, Buddhism has no restrictions on divorce. Ven. K. Sri Dhammananda has said "if a husband and wife really cannot live together, instead of leading a miserable life and harboring more jealousy, anger and hatred, they should have the liberty to separate and live peacefully."

See also

 Bahá'í marriage
 Buddhism and sexual orientation
 Buddhism and romantic relationships
 Buddhism and sexuality
 Christian views on marriage
 Interfaith marriage
 Jewish views on marriage
 List of religions and spiritual traditions
 Marriage in Hinduism
 Marriage in Islam

References

External links
 Marriage articles at the Access to Insight site
 Weddings and Theravada Buddhism
 A Zen Buddhist perspective on same-sex marriage
 Lengthy review of Buddhist views on married life in relation to the western world.

 
Marriage, Buddhist view of